("Where are you heading?", literally: "Where do you go?"), 166, is a church cantata by Johann Sebastian Bach. He composed it in Leipzig for Cantate, the fourth Sunday after Easter, and first performed it on 7 May 1724.

History and words 
Bach composed the cantata in his first year in Leipzig for the Fourth Sunday after Easter, called Cantate. The prescribed readings for the Sunday were from the Epistle of James, "Every good gift comes from the Father of lights", and from the Gospel of John, Jesus announcing the Comforter in his Farewell Discourse.

We do not know the identity of the person who was writing Bach's librettos during his first year in Leipzig.  The poet, whoever he or she was, begins by posing a question, a quotation from the gospel.  The answer to the question is the theme of the cantata, which explores the direction in which life should go. The poet inserted as movement 3 the third stanza of Bartholomäus Ringwaldt's hymn "" (1582) and as the closing chorale the first stanza of Ämilie Juliane von Schwarzburg-Rudolstadt's "" (1688).

Scoring and structure 
The cantata in six movements is scored for four vocal soloists (soprano, alto, tenor and bass), a four-part choir only for the closing chorale, oboe, two violins, viola and basso continuo. The cantus firmus of movement 3 is typically sung by the soprano of the choir.

 Arioso (bass): 
 Aria (tenor): 
 Chorale (soprano): 
 Recitative (bass): 
 Aria (alto): 
 Chorale:

Music 
The question "Where do you go?", comes from a particular context (John 16:5: "but now I am going to him who sent me. None of you asks me, 'Where are you going?"). Bach gives the question on its own to the bass as the  addressing the listener directly. This simple question is one of the shortest lyrics for a movement in a Bach cantata.

The tenor aria survives in an incomplete form. It was first published completely in the Neue Bach-Ausgabe. The soprano sings the cantus firmus of movement 3 on the melody of "" completely unadorned and is accompanied by the violins and viola in unison, "of great vigour and determination, urged on by steady continuo quavers". The last aria, in great contrast, illustrates mostly the word "" (laughs), although the text warns that a fall may come "" (when fortune winks). The laughter is pictured in "the various oscillating semi-quaver figures in the strings" and in melismas on the word "". The final chorale on the melody of ""  is set for four parts.

Recordings 
 Die Bach Kantate Vol. 32, Helmuth Rilling, Gächinger Kantorei, Bach-Collegium Stuttgart, Helen Watts, Aldo Baldin, Wolfgang Schöne, Hänssler 1978
 J. S. Bach: Das Kantatenwerk – Sacred Cantatas Vol. 9, Gustav Leonhardt, Tölzer Knabenchor, Collegium Vocale Gent, Leonhardt Consort, soloist of the Tölzer Knabenchor, Paul Esswood, Kurt Equiluz, Max van Egmond, Teldec 1987
 J. S. Bach: Complete Cantatas Vol. 9, Ton Koopman, Amsterdam Baroque Orchestra & Choir, Bernhard Landauer, Christoph Prégardien, Klaus Mertens, Antoine Marchand 1998
 Bach Cantatas Vol. 24: Altenburg/Warwick, John Eliot Gardiner, Monteverdi Choir, English Baroque Soloists, Robin Tyson, James Gilchrist, Stephen Varcoe, Soli Deo Gloria 2000
 J. S. Bach: Cantatas Vol. 19 (Cantatas from Leipzig 1724), Masaaki Suzuki, Bach Collegium Japan, Robin Blaze, Makoto Sakurada, Stephan MacLeod, BIS 2001
 J. S. Bach: Kantate BWV 166 "Wo gehest du hin?", Rudolf Lutz, Vokalensemble der Schola Seconda Pratica, Schola Seconda Pratica, Guro Hjemli, Terry Wey, Gerd Türk, Markus Volpert, Gallus Media 2008

Notes

References

Sources 
 
 Wo gehest du hin? BWV 166; BC A 71 / Sacred cantata (5th Sunday of Easter) Bach Digital
 Cantata BWV 166 Wo gehest du hin?: history, scoring, sources for text and music, translations to various languages, discography, discussion, Bach Cantatas Website
 BWV 166 Wo gehest du hin?: English translation, University of Vermont
 BWV 166 Wo gehest du hin?: text, scoring, University of Alberta
 
 Luke Dahn:BWV 166.6 bach-chorales.com

Church cantatas by Johann Sebastian Bach
1724 compositions